Dharti Kahe Pukar Ke may refer to:
Dharti Kahe Pukar Ke (1969 film)
Dharti Kahe Pukar Ke (2006 film)